A banana split is a dessert that includes a banana and ice cream.

"Banana Split" or "Banana Splits" can also refer to:

 Banana Sundae, a Filipino comedy gag show known from 2008 to 2011 as Banana Split
 Banana Split (film), a 2018 American comedy film
 "Le Banana Split", a 1979 song by Belgian pop singer Lio
 The Banana Splits, a fictional musical group featured on the 1968–1970 American TV show The Banana Splits Adventure Hour
 "The Tra La La Song (One Banana, Two Banana)", the theme song for the series, sometimes referred to as "Banana Splits (Tra La La Song)"

See also
 Banana boat (food), a dessert involving banana, chocolate and marshmallow